Iranshah may refer to:
 Iranshah Atash Behram, Udvada, India-
 Iranshah, Lorestan, Iran
 Iranshah, alternate name of Iran Shahi, Iran
 Irānshāh (poet) or Iranshan, Persian poet during the Seljuq dynasty of Malik-Shah I
 Iranshah ibn Turanshah

See also
 Iranshahr (disambiguation)